Soufiane Rahimi (born 2 June 1996) is a Moroccan professional footballer who plays as a forward for Al Ain and the Morocco national team. He started his professional career playing for Raja CA.

Club career

Raja Club Athletic 
Rahimi scored a total of four goals for Raja CA in 2018 CAF Confederation Cup campaign, including two goals in the final against AS Vita Club in Casablanca. This allowed them to qualify and play the 2019 CAF Super Cup against Espérance Sportive de Tunis; which then ended up winning after a 2–1 victory.

He has been one of the highest performing players in the last two seasons of the Botola Pro, becoming a top pick for the Morocco national team coach to join the Moroccan squad of local players. He has been closely linked with a move from the Botola to Europe, and has stated his ambition of joining the Serie A in press conferences.

Al Ain 
On 21 August 2021, he had played his last match with Raja CA in the 2020 Arab Club Champions Cup Final, therefore defeating Al-Ittihad in penalties; before transferring to Emirati club Al Ain. On September 17, Rahimi scored his first goal for the club in a 4-1 victory against Al-Ittihad Kalba. On 12 November 2022, Rahimi scored a double against Sharjah FC.

International career 
In 2018, Rahimi was called up to the Moroccan national A' team by Jamal Sellami. Rahimi represented Morocco in the 2020 African Nations Championship, He scored a double in his third game of the group stages against Uganda. He scored in the quarter-finals in a 3–1 victory against Zambia. Morocco won an astonishing 4–0 in the semi-finals against Cameroon. With this performance, Rahimi managed of scoring a total of five goals thus helping his country to achieve the title and becoming the first and only country to win the Championship back to back. He was awarded top scorer and best player of the tournament.

Career statistics

Club

International

Scores and results list Morocco's goal tally first, score column indicates score after each Rahimi goal.

Honours
Raja CA
 Botola: 2019–20
 CAF Confederation Cup: 2018, 2020–21
 CAF Super Cup: 2019
 Arab Champions League: 2019–20

Al Ain
 Pro League:  2021–22
 League Cup: 2021–22

Morocco
 African Nations Championship: 2020

Individual
 Best Player in Botola: 2019–20, 2020–21
 Best Young player in Botola: 2018–19
 Botola Top Assist Provider: 2020–21
 Best Player in African Nations Championship: 2020
 Top Scorer in African Nations Championship: 2020
 African Nations Championship Team of the Tournament: 2020
 Raja CA Player of the season: 2020 
 Raja CA Goal of the Season: 2021
 Pro League player of the month: September 2021, November 2021, February 2022, October 2022 February 2023
 Pro League Best Fans player of the year: 2022 

Record
 Fastest goal in history of CHAN

References

External links
 
 
 

1996 births
Living people
Moroccan footballers
Footballers from Casablanca
Association football wingers
Morocco international footballers
2020 African Nations Championship players
2021 Africa Cup of Nations players
Raja CA players
Al Ain FC players
Botola players
UAE Pro League players
Moroccan expatriate footballers
Moroccan expatriate sportspeople in the United Arab Emirates
Expatriate footballers in the United Arab Emirates
Morocco A' international footballers